Po Krei Brei (?–?), also known as Cei Krei Brei, was a ruler of Champa who briefly ruled in 1793. His Vietnamese name was Nguyễn Văn Chiêu (阮文昭).

Po Krei Brei was a Champa prince, he was a brother of Po Tisuntiraidapuran (Nguyễn Văn Tá). In 1790, Nguyễn Ánh retook Gia Định (present-day Ho Chi Minh City), Po Krei Brei and Po Ladhuanpuguh (Nguyễn Văn Hào) joint Nguyễn army. They were appointed co-rulers of Champa by Nguyễn Ánh. Po Krei Brei was the civilian governor with the title chưởng cơ, while Po Ladhuanpuguh served as the military governor with the title cai cơ. Since then, Champa was regarded as a province by Vietnam, instead of a country.

Not long after, Po Krei Brei was deposed. He and his family were forced to seek refugee in Cambodia in 1795-1796 at Roka Po Pram, Thbong Khmum province (now Kampong Cham).

In Archives royales du Champa, there were two records about him: CAM-37 and CAM-38.

References

Kings of Champa